Marvin Pope (born January 18, 1969) is a former American football and Canadian football linebacker in the Canadian Football League for the Calgary Stampeders. He played college football at Central State University.

Early years
Pope attended Eastside High School, where he lettered in football, basketball, wrestling, track and weightlifting. In football, he was a two-way player at fullback and linebacker. As a senior, he received Class AAAA All-state and Florida High School Athlete of the Year honors honors, after averaging 13 tackles per game. Although he was considered an elite football prospect, he was not offered Division I scholarships because of grades.

As a senior, he won the state Class AAA heavyweight weightlifting champion, including the District 5 meet with a record lift totaling 750, 330 on the clean-and-jerk and 420 on bench press. In wrestling, he was ranked third in the state as a junior and senior.

College career
Pope initially accepted a football scholarship from Division I-AA Western Kentucky University, only to later commit to NAIA Central State University, because of its reputation for developing professional football players. 

As a junior in 1990, he led a defense that dominated in the NAIA playoffs, holding opponents to 13.2 points per game. His 13 tackles, earned him the NAIA Defensive Most Valuable Player trophy in the 38-16 championship win over Colorado-Mesa State University.

He finished his college career with 52 games, 363 tackles. He was named an NAIA All-American and Black College Football All-American in the 1989 and 1990 seasons.

In 2018, he was inducted into the Central State University Athletics Hall of Fame.

Professional career
In May 1992, he signed as a free agent with the Calgary Stampeders of the Canadian Football League. As a rookie, he contributed from his linebacker position to the team winning the Grey Cup. He set a CFL record with 14 tackles against the Edmonton Eskimos.

He played as a linebacker and defensive end. He took part of 5 consecutive Western Conference Championship games and was a two-time CFL Western All Star.

Personal life
Pope began his coaching career at Calgary's Springbank Community High School, contributing to the 1999 City Championship title. In 2000, he was hired as an assistant coach at Calgary's Henry Wise Wood Senior High School, contributing to both a City and Provincial Championship titles.

In 2010, he joined the Calgary Stampeders staff as an assistant defensive line and linebackers coach for one season. In 2013, he returned to high school coaching at Robert Thirsk High School, contributing to a City Championship. 

In 2014, he was named the defensive coordinator for the Calgary Colts in the Canadian Junior Football League. In 2018, he was hired as the defensive coordinator for the Langley Rams in the Canadian Junior Football League. In 2019, he was named the defensive line coach for the University of Calgary.

References

External links
Marvin Pope statistics at JustSportsStats.com
Central State University Hall of Fame bio

1969 births
American football linebackers
American players of Canadian football
Calgary Stampeders players
Canadian football linebackers
Central State Marauders football players
Living people
Sportspeople from Gainesville, Florida
Eastside High School (Gainesville, Florida) alumni
Calgary Stampeders coaches
Calgary Dinos football coaches
Players of American football from Gainesville, Florida